Puya ctenorhyncha is a species in the genus Puya. This species is endemic to Bolivia.

References

ctenorhyncha
Flora of Bolivia